Lorne Wallace Sam (born December 5, 1984) is a former professional American and Canadian football quarterback. He was signed by the Denver Broncos as an undrafted free agent in 2008. He played college football at Texas-El Paso.

Sam has been a member of the Green Bay Packers and Winnipeg Blue Bombers. He was also the starting quarterback for the Coventry Jets in the United Kingdom. He is the younger brother of NFL wide receiver P. K. Sam.

College career
Sam originally played at Florida State, but transferred to University Texas-El Paso for his final two years of college. A versatile collegiate player, Sam was exclusively used as a wide receiver at Florida State, but at UTEP he played both quarterback and running back.

Professional career

Denver Broncos
Sam was signed by the Denver Broncos as an undrafted free agent on April 28, 2008 but was waived four months later on August 25.

Green Bay Packers
Sam was signed to the Green Bay Packers' practice squad on December 3, 2008. He was re–signed to a future contract at the end of the season but was waived on June 23, 2009.

Winnipeg Blue Bombers
Sam signed a practice roster agreement with the Winnipeg Blue Bombers on July 13, 2009. He was released on August 21.

Coventry Jets
Sam was the starting quarterback for the 2008 National Champions, Coventry Jets. He led the team to their fourth consecutive national final, the Jets losing to the London Blitz at Sixways Stadium, Worcester. Sam had 151 completions for 2416 yards and 30 touchdowns for the Jets.

Personal
Has two siblings an older brother, P. K. Sam, who has played with several NFL teams and with the CFL's Toronto Argonauts and a sister, Autumn, who is a sportscaster in Atlanta, GA.

References

External links
Denver Broncos bio
Florida State Seminoles bio
UTEP Miners bio
Winnipeg Blue Bombers bio

1984 births
Living people
Players of American football from Colorado
American football quarterbacks
American football wide receivers
American players of Canadian football
Canadian football wide receivers
Florida State Seminoles football players
UTEP Miners football players
Denver Broncos players
Winnipeg Blue Bombers players
Colorado Crush (IFL) players
Bricktown Brawlers players
Sioux Falls Storm players
Green Bay Packers players